The University of North Dakota School of Medicine and Health Sciences is located in Grand Forks, North Dakota at the University of North Dakota (UND) and is the only school of medicine in the state of North Dakota.

The school has trained roughly half of the physicians currently practicing in the state. Nearly 20 percent of American physicians identifying as American Indian/Alaska Native in the United States were trained at the school. Also, the medical school has been ranked third nationally in the area of rural medicine and first for the percentage of graduates choosing family medicine. The school has four campuses located throughout North Dakota. The Northeast Campus, which is the main campus, is located in Grand Forks. The Northwest campus is located in Downtown Minot, the Southeast Campus is located in the Washington neighborhood in Fargo and the Southwest Campus is located in Downtown Bismarck.

The School also hosts professional programs for students interested in physician assistant studies, physical therapy, occupational therapy, medical laboratory science, sports medicine, and public health. It also offers master and doctoral-level training for researchers focused on the biomedical sciences and clinical and translational science.

In 2020 the School announced it would be taking applications for the world's first standalone doctoral program in indigenous health.

Research
Research is also a very important part of the UND School of Medicine and Health Sciences. In fiscal year 2020, research awards totaled nearly $31 million. The medical school is also home to the Center for Rural Health, which focuses on the health of rural communities and has been awarded numerous grants. The Center's programs include the nationally recognized Rural Health Information Hub, the National Resource Center on Native American Aging and other programs. In 2009, President Barack Obama appointed former Center for Rural Health Director, Dr. Mary Wakefield, the Administrator of the Human Resources and Services Administration (HRSA).

History
The school was founded in 1905 to provide the first two years of medical education, first offering students a Bachelor of Sciences in Medicine (BS Med) degree. In 1973, the school began granting the MD degree to students, though the third year of medical school was spent at either Mayo Medical School or the University of Minnesota Medical School. The School expanded to the full four-year medical curriculum in 1981, and the school slowly phased out the exchange third year by 1984.

In May 2013, the 63rd Assembly of the North Dakota Legislature approved funding for a new $124 million, 325,000-square-foot, four-story building on the northeast corner of the UND campus. This building was completed in the summer of 2016 and opened on August 1, 2016.

References

External links

University of North Dakota School of Medicine and Health Sciences website
University of North Dakota website
Center for Rural Health website
Rural Health Information Hub website

Medical schools in North Dakota
Medicine and Health Sciences
Buildings and structures in Grand Forks, North Dakota
1905 establishments in North Dakota
Educational institutions established in 1905